) are a group of limbless, vermiform (worm-shaped) or serpentine (snake-shaped) amphibians. They mostly live hidden in soil or in streambeds, and this cryptic lifestyle renders caecilians among the least familiar amphibians. Modern caecilians live in the tropics of South and Central America, Africa, and southern Asia. Caecilians feed on small subterranean creatures such as earthworms. The body is cylindrical and often darkly coloured, and the skull is bullet-shaped and strongly built. Caecilian heads have several unique adaptations, including fused cranial and jaw bones, a two-part system of jaw muscles, and a chemosensory tentacle in front of the eye. The skin is slimy and bears ringlike markings or grooves, which may contain tiny scales.

Modern caecilians are grouped as a clade, Apoda , one of three living amphibian groups alongside Anura (frogs) and Urodela (salamanders). Apoda is a crown group, encompassing modern, entirely limbless caecilians. There are more than 200 living species of caecilian distributed across 10 families. The caecilian total group is an order known as Gymnophiona , which includes Apoda as well as a few extinct stem-group caecilians (amphibians related to modern caecilians but evolving prior to the crown group). Gymnophiona as a name derives from the Greek words  /  and  / , as the caecilians were originally thought to be related to snakes.

The study of caecilian evolution is complicated by their poor fossil record and specialized anatomy. Genetic evidence and some anatomical details (such as pedicellate teeth) support the idea that frogs, salamanders, and caecilians (collectively known as lissamphibians) are each others' closest relatives. Frogs and salamanders show many similarities to dissorophoids, a group of extinct amphibians in the order Temnospondyli. Caecilians are more controversial; many studies extend dissorophoid ancestry to caecilians. Some studies have instead argued that caecilians descend from extinct lepospondyl or stereospondyl amphibians, contradicting evidence for lissamphibian monophyly (common ancestry). Rare fossils of early gymnophionans such as Eocaecilia and Funcusvermis have helped to test the various conflicting hypotheses for the relationships between caecilians and other living and extinct amphibians.

Description 

Caecilians anatomy is highly adapted for a burrowing lifestyle. Their tails are short or absent, and their cloacae are near the ends of their bodies.

Except for one lungless species, Atretochoana eiselti, all caecilians have lungs, but also use their skin or mouths for oxygen absorption. Often, the left lung is much smaller than the right one, an adaptation to body shape that is also found in snakes.

Their muscles are adapted to pushing their way through the ground, with the skeleton and deep muscles acting as a piston inside the skin and outer muscles. This allows the animal to anchor its hind end in position, and force the head forwards, and then pull the rest of the body up to reach it in waves. In water or very loose mud, caecilians instead swim in an eel-like fashion. Caecilians in the family Typhlonectidae are aquatic, and the largest of their kind. The representatives of this family have a fleshy fin running along the rear section of their bodies, which enhances propulsion in water.

Skull and senses 
Caecilians have small or absent eyes, with only a single known class of photoreceptors, and their vision is limited to dark-light perception. Unlike other modern amphibians (frogs and salamanders) the skull is compact and solid, with few large openings between plate-like cranial bones. The snout is pointed and bullet-shaped, used to force their way through soil or mud. In most species the mouth is recessed under the head, so that the snout overhangs the mouth.

The bones in the skull are reduced in number compared to prehistoric amphibian species. Many bones of the skull are fused together: the maxilla and palatine bones have fused into a maxillopalatine in all living caecilians, and the nasal and premaxilla bones fuse into a nasopremaxilla in some families. Some families can be differentiated by the presence of absence of certain skull bones, such as the septomaxillae, prefrontals, an/or a postfrontal-like bone surrounding the orbit (eye socket). The braincase is encased in a fully integrated compound bone called the os basale, which takes up most of the rear and lower parts of the skull. In skulls viewed from above, a mesethmoid bone may be visible in some species, wedging into the midline of the skull roof.

All caecilians have a pair of unique sensory structures, known as tentacles, located on either side of the head between the eyes and nostrils. These are probably used for a second olfactory capability, in addition to the normal sense of smell based in the nose.

The ringed caecilian (Siphonops annulatus) has dental glands that may be homologous to the venom glands of some snakes and lizards. The function of these glands is unknown.

The middle ear consists of only the stapes bone and the oval window, which transfer vibrations into the inner ear through a reentrant fluid circuit as seen in some reptiles. Species within the family Scolecomorphidae lack both a stapes and an oval window, making them the only known amphibians missing all the components of a middle ear apparatus.

The lower jaw is specialized in caecilians. Gymnophionans, including extinct species, have only two components of the jaw: the pseudodentary (at the front, bearing teeth) and pseudoangular (at the back, bearing the jaw joint and muscle attachments). These two components are what remains following fusion between a larger set of bones. An additional inset tooth row with up to 20 teeth lies parallel to the main marginal tooth row of the jaw.

All but the most primitive caecilians have two sets of muscles for closing the jaw, compared with the single pair found in other amphibians. One set of muscles, the adductors, insert into the upper edge of the pseudoangular in front of the jaw joint. Adductor muscles are commonplace in vertebrates, and close the jaw by pulling upwards and forwards. A more unique set of muscles, the abductors, insert into the rear edge of the pseudoangular below and behind the jaw joint. They close the jaw by pulling backwards and downwards. Jaw muscles are more highly developed in the most efficient burrowers among the caecilians, and appear to help keep the skull and jaw rigid.

Skin 

Their skin is smooth and usually dark, but some species have colourful skins. Inside the skin are calcite scales. Because of these scales, the caecilians were once thought to be related to the fossil Stegocephalia, but they are now believed to be a secondary development, and the two groups are most likely unrelated. Scales are absent in the families Scolecomorphidae and Typhlonectidae, except the species Typhlonectes compressicauda where minute scales have been found in the hinder region of the body. The skin also has numerous ring-shaped folds, or annuli, that partially encircle the body, giving them a segmented appearance. Like some other living amphibians, the skin contains glands that secrete a toxin to deter predators. The skin secretions of Siphonops paulensis have been shown to have hemolytic properties.

Distribution 

Caecilians are native to wet, tropical regions of Southeast Asia, India, Bangladesh, Nepal and Sri Lanka, parts of East and West Africa, the Seychelles Islands in the Indian Ocean, Central America, and in northern and eastern South America. In Africa, caecilians are found from Guinea-Bissau (Geotrypetes) to southern Malawi (Scolecomorphus), with an unconfirmed record from eastern Zimbabwe. They have not been recorded from the extensive areas of tropical forest in central Africa. In South America, they extend through subtropical eastern Brazil well into temperate northern Argentina. They can be seen as far south as Buenos Aires, when they are carried by the flood waters of the Paraná River coming from farther north. Their American range extends north to southern Mexico. The northernmost distribution is of the species Ichthyophis sikkimensis of northern India. Ichthyophis is also found in South China and Northern Vietnam. In Southeast Asia, they are found as far east as Java, Borneo, and the southern Philippines, but they have not crossed Wallace's line and are not present in Australia or nearby islands. There are no known caecilians in Madagascar, but their presence in the Seychelles and India has led to speculation on the presence of undiscovered extinct or extant caecilians there.

In 2021, a live specimen of Typhlonectes natans, a caecilian native to Colombia and Venezuela, was collected from a drainage canal in South Florida. It was the only caecilian ever reported in the wild in the United States, and is considered to be an introduction, perhaps from the wildlife trade. Whether a breeding population has been established in the area is unknown.

Taxonomy 

The name caecilian derives from the Latin word caecus, meaning "blind", referring to the small or sometimes nonexistent eyes. The name dates back to the taxonomic name of the first species described by Carl Linnaeus, which he named Caecilia tentaculata.

There has historically been disagreement over the use of the two primary scientific names for caecilians, Apoda and Gymnophiona. Some specialists prefer to use the name Gymnophiona to refer to the "crown group", that is, the group containing all modern caecilians and extinct members of these modern lineages. They sometimes use the name Apoda to refer to the total group, that is, all caecilians and caecilian-like amphibians that are more closely related to modern groups than to frogs or salamanders. However, many scientists have advocated for the reverse arrangement, where Apoda is used as the name for modern caecilian groups. Some have argued that this use makes more sense, because the name "Apoda" means "without feet", and this is a feature associated mainly with modern species (some stem-group caecilian-like amphibians, such as Eocaecilia, had legs).

A classification of caecilians by Wilkinson et al. (2011) divided the caecilians into 9 families containing nearly 200 species. In 2012, a tenth caecilian family was newly described, Chikilidae. This classification is based on a thorough definition of monophyly based on morphological and molecular evidence, and it solves the longstanding problems of paraphyly of the Caeciliidae in previous classifications without an exclusive reliance upon synonymy. There are 219 species of caecilian in 33 genera and 10 families.

The most recent phylogeny of caecilians is based on molecular mitogenomic evidence examined by San Mauro et al. (2014), and modified to include some more recently described genera such as Amazops.

Evolution 

Little is known of the evolutionary history of the caecilians, which have left a very sparse fossil record. The first fossil, a vertebra dated to the Paleocene, was not discovered until 1972. Other vertebrae, which have characteristic features unique to modern species, were later found in Paleocene and Late Cretaceous (Cenomanian) sediments.

Prior to 2023, the earliest fossil attributed to a stem-caecilian (an amphibian closer to caecilians than to frogs or salamanders but not a member of the extant caecilian lineage) comes from the Jurassic period. This primitive genus, Eocaecilia, had small limbs and well-developed eyes. In their 2008 description of the Early Permian amphibian Gerobatrachus, Anderson and co-authors suggested that caecilians arose from the Lepospondyl group of ancestral tetrapods, and may be more closely related to amniotes than to frogs and salamanders, which arose from Temnospondyl ancestors. Numerous groups of lepospondyls evolved reduced limbs, elongated bodies, and burrowing behaviors, and morphological studies on Permian and Carboniferous lepospondyls have placed the early caecilian (Eocaecilia) among these groups. Divergent origins of caecilians and other extant amphibians may help explain the slight discrepancy between fossil dates for the origins of modern Amphibia, which suggest Permian origins, and the earlier dates, in the Carboniferous, predicted by some molecular clock studies of DNA sequences. Most morphological and molecular studies of extant amphibians, however, support monophyly for caecilians, frogs, and salamanders, and the most recent molecular study based on multi-locus data suggest a Late Carboniferous–Early Permian origin of extant amphibians.

Chinlestegophis, a stereospondyl temnospondyl from the Late Triassic Chinle Formation of Colorado, was proposed to be a stem-caecilian in a 2017 paper by Pardo and co-authors. If confirmed, this would bolster the proposed pre-Triassic origin of Lissamphibia suggested by molecular clocks. It would fill a gap in the fossil record of early caecilians and suggest that stereospondyls as a whole qualify as stem-group caecilians. However, affinities between Chinlestegophis and gymnophionans have been disputed along several lines of evidence. A 2020 study questioned the choice of characters supporting the relationship, and a 2019 reanalysis of the original data matrix found that other equally parsimonious positions were supported for the placement of Chinlestegophis and gymnophionans among tetrapods.

A 2023 paper by Kligman and co-authors described Funcusvermis, another amphibian from the Chinle Formation of Arizona. Funcusvermis was strongly supported as a stem group caecilian based on traits of its numerous skull and jaw fragments, the largest sample of caecilian fossils known. The paper discussed the various hypotheses for caecilian origins: the polyphyly hypothesis (caecilians as lepospondyls, and other lissamphibians as temnospondyls), the lepospondyl hypothesis (lissamphibians as lepospondyls), and the newer hypothesis supported by Chinlestegophis, where caecilians and other lissamphibians had separate origins within temnospondyls. Nevertheless, all of these ideas were refuted, and the most strongly supported hypothesis combined lissamphibians into a monophyletic group of dissorophoid temnospondyls closely related to Gerobatrachus.

Behavior

Reproduction 

Caecilians are the only order of amphibians to use internal insemination exclusively (although most salamanders have internal fertilization and the tailed frog in the US uses a tail-like appendage for internal insemination in its fast-flowing water environment). The male caecilians have a long tube-like intromittent organ, the phallodeum, which is inserted into the cloaca of the female for two to three hours. About 25% of the species are oviparous (egg-laying); the eggs are laid in terrestrial nests rather than in water and are guarded by the female. For some species, the young caecilians are already metamorphosed when they hatch; others hatch as larvae. The larvae are not fully aquatic, but spend the daytime in the soil near the water.

About 75% of caecilians are viviparous, meaning they give birth to already-developed offspring. The foetus is fed inside the female with cells lining the oviduct, which they eat with special scraping teeth. Some larvae, such as those of Typhlonectes, are born with enormous external gills which are shed almost immediately.

The egg-laying herpelid species Boulengerula taitana feeds its young by developing an outer layer of skin, high in fat and other nutrients, which the young peel off with modified teeth. This allows them to grow by up to 10 times their own weight in a week. The skin is consumed every three days, the time it takes for a new layer to grow, and the young have only been observed to eat it at night. It was formerly thought that the juveniles subsisted only on a liquid secretion from their mothers. This form of parental care, known as maternal dermatophagy, has also been reported in two species in the family Siphonopidae: Siphonops annulatus and Microcaecilia dermatophaga. Siphonopids and herpelids are not closely related to each other, having diverged in the Cretaceous Period. The presence of maternal dermatophagy in both families suggest that it may be more widespread among caecilians than previously considered.

Diet 
The diets of caecilians are not well known. Mature caecilians seem to feed mostly on insects and other invertebrates found in the habitat of the respective species. The stomach contents of 14 specimens of Boulengerula taitana consisted of mostly unidentifiable organic material and plant remains.  Where identifiable remains were most abundant, they were found to be termite heads. While the undefinable organic material may show the caecilians eat detritus, the remains may be from earthworms. Caecilians in captivity can be easily fed with earthworms, and worms are also common in the habitat of many caecilian species.

See also 

 Caecilians of the Western Ghats
 Minhocão – a cryptid that resembles caecilians

References

External links 
 
 

 
 
Mesozoic amphibians
Hettangian first appearances
Extant Early Jurassic first appearances
Taxa named by Johannes Peter Müller